Stethorrhagus is a genus of South American corinnid sac spiders first described by Eugène Simon in 1896.

Species
 it contains fifteen species:
Stethorrhagus archangelus Bonaldo & Brescovit, 1994 – Brazil
Stethorrhagus chalybeius (L. Koch, 1866) – Colombia
Stethorrhagus duidae Gertsch, 1942 – Venezuela
Stethorrhagus hyula Bonaldo & Brescovit, 1994 – Colombia
Stethorrhagus latoma Bonaldo & Brescovit, 1994 – Venezuela
Stethorrhagus limbatus Simon, 1896 (type) – Brazil, Guyana
Stethorrhagus lupulus Simon, 1896 – Colombia, Venezuela, Peru, Brazil
Stethorrhagus maculatus (L. Koch, 1866) – Colombia
Stethorrhagus nigrinus (Berland, 1913) – Ecuador
Stethorrhagus oxossi Bonaldo & Brescovit, 1994 – Brazil
Stethorrhagus peckorum Bonaldo & Brescovit, 1994 – Venezuela
Stethorrhagus penai Bonaldo & Brescovit, 1994 – Ecuador
Stethorrhagus planada Bonaldo & Brescovit, 1994 – Colombia
Stethorrhagus roraimae Gertsch, 1942 – Brazil
Stethorrhagus tridentatus Caporiacco, 1955 – Venezuela

References

Araneomorphae genera
Corinnidae
Spiders of South America
Taxa named by Eugène Simon